WCSU-FM (88.9 FM) is a National Public Radio member station. Licensed in Wilberforce, Ohio, United States, the station is currently owned by Central State University. Music programming is a contemporary/smooth jazz blend with some urban gospel programming.

It is the oldest HBCU radio station.

In the early 1980s, the station was programmed by Program Director Willis Parker. The General Manager was LaRue Turner, who was also WCSU-FM's Chief Engineer. Dr. Fuad Suleiman was the Administrator responsible for the Telecommunications function at CSU.  A small corps of full-time staff and CSU students operated the station 24 hours a day, 7 days a week. The station offered music, NPR (National Public Radio) news and other syndicated content; it also provided a handful of station-generated original programming, including hour-long local and state-oriented news/public-affairs shows, and a live, nightly talk show, called "At Issue". From time-to-time, the station broadcast convocation speakers and CSU athletic events as well as sending on-air staff into the community for remote broadcasts (such as at the Greene County Fair).

External links
 WCSU official website
 

NPR member stations
Central State University
CSU-FM
Jazz radio stations in the United States
Radio stations established in 1980
1980 establishments in Ohio